Loneliness Can Kill is a Hong Kong television series produced by HK Television Entertainment and aired on ViuTV between 18 April and 6 June 2020. In the form of an anthology series, the programme is based on real-life events and interviews, and explores several social issues intensified by loneliness. It featured Alma Kwok, Yatho Wong, Kinlong Chan and Howell Tsang as the in-show crew who expressed their feelings and analyses during the production of the programme.

Cast

Recurring characters 
Alma Kwok as Chocho (草草), scriptwriter
Kinlong Chan as Paul (波叔), director
Howell Tsang as Luke (阿碌), researcher
Yatho Wong as A.J., assistant director

Unit characters 
Inferior Elderly
Akio Takei as Nishida Tsukasa (西田司)
Tsuruta Hiromi as Suzuki Ryōko (鈴木涼子)

Left-handed
Lee Jae-hee as Tae-ki (泰基)
Kim Kyeong-min as Sang-ji (尚智)
Eom Tae-hyeon as Beom-cheol (凡哲)
Kim Soo-beum as Tong-shin (東勝)

Good 168 Hours
Lee Chiu-wai as Wah (華仔)
 Cheng Cheuk-name as younger Wah
Chan Mei-shan as Wah's mother

Spirit of Marketing
Mang Fan-wing as Matsuko (松子)
Kwok Shiu-fan as Shadow
Yonetaro Shimizu as Hans

Untouchable Lovers
Liu Shuk-fan as Annie
Giovanni Valencia as Mike (stock photo)
Olanrewaju as scammer
Olalekan as scammer
ramos as scammer

Episodes

Accolades

|-
| 2020
| Asian Academy Creative Awards
| Best Infotainment Programme – National Winner for Hong Kong
| Loneliness Can Kill - The Left Behind (II) 
| 
|
|-
| rowspan=2|2021
| The Telly Awards
| Silver - Television: General-Public Interest/Awareness
| Loneliness Can Kill
| 
|
|-
| New York Festivals TV & Film Awards
| Entertainment Program: Educational/Instructional
| Loneliness Can Kill
| 
|
|}

References

External links
Official website

ViuTV original programming
Hong Kong drama television series
Cantonese-language television shows
Television series based on actual events